The Shell Spher process (Shell Pellet Heat Exchange Retorting) is an above ground fluidization bed retorting technology for shale oil extraction.  It is classified as a hot recycled solids technology.

Raw oil shale is crushed to a fine particles. Heat is transferred to oil shale by heat-carrying ceramic balls of size . Heated ceramic balls fall then through the bed in counter-current direction. The  preheated oil shale is further heated in the retorting vessel. The retorted spent shale is cooled in a fast-fluidized bed by the recirculated cool pellets from the preheater; while cooling the spent shale ceramic balls are heated by the spent shale.

See also
 Alberta Taciuk Process
 Kiviter process
 Petrosix process
 Galoter process
 Fushun process
 Paraho process
 Lurgi-Ruhrgas process
 TOSCO II process

References

Oil shale technology